Halchowk Stadium (also known as APF Stadium) is a multi-purpose stadium in Kathmandu in Bagmati Province of Nepal. The stadium holds 3,500 people.

It is mainly used for soccer matches and has a grass playing surface. The last major tournament hosted there was the 2019 SAFF U-18 Championship.

Hosted events
2005 AFC President's Cup
2012 AFC Challenge Cup
2013 SAFF Championship
2017 SAFF U-15 Championship
2019 SAFF U-18 Championship
regular matches of Martyr's Memorial A-Division League
regular matches of Martyr's Memorial B-Division League
selected matches of the Nepal national football team

References

Football venues in Nepal
Multi-purpose stadiums in Nepal
Sports venues in Kathmandu
1998 establishments in Nepal